Torella may refer to a pair of Italian municipalities:

Torella dei Lombardi, in the Province of Avellino, Campania
Torella del Sannio, in the Province of Campobasso, Molise

See also
Torello (disambiguation)
Torelli
Toro (disambiguation)